John Cole (born June 16, 1988) is a Zimbabwean choreographer and performing artist.

Early youth
John Cole was born into a family of six to Phillip Cole and Beverley Johnson in 1988. He grew up in the suburb of Sunningdale, Harare. After his parents died, Cole stayed with his grandmother. John Cole attended Primary School at  Ardbennie Primary School and Sunningdale but could not continue with his O Levels at Morgan High School.

Early career 
John attempted a sports career as a cricketer and underwent trials with the Zimbabwe National Cricket team, but could not go on due to an injury. After the injury, Cole focused on dancing starting his dance career in 2004 with Slicker dance crew.

John was part of dance a troupe The Inmates dance crew which won the inaugural Jibilika Dance Competition in 2007.

Career
Cole has choreographed for Zimbabwe's top artistes such as Ammara Brown, Jah Prayzah, Cynthia Mare Winky D, Mai Titi Sharon Manatsa Vimbai Zimuto as well as national events, concerts and events in Zimbabwe including former Zimbabwe first lady Grace Mugabe birthday party

Cole is the founder and president of The Zimbabwe Choreographers and Dancers Association as well as president of Zimbabwe Dance Industry Awards. Cole is former dance teacher at Harare International School and Maranatha Group of Schools.

Music 
Cole is a recording artist with five studio songs featuring Lee Mchoney, Ghanaian Theophilus Nii Arday Otoo/ Epixode, Dj Naida and Ashta Eez

Discography

Choreography 
John Cole is said to have choreographed over 500 weddings. He was one of the many notable choreographers that choreographed a number of viral Zimbabwean corporate videos for the Jerusalema dancer challenge He choreographed the Nash TV debut performance by Zimbabwean comedian socialite Felistas Murata Edwards, known as Mai TT.

Television 
John's on-screen performances started off on Zimbabwe Broadcasting Corporation. Cole then featured in Zimbabwean productions Far From Yesterday and the series Man Hounds.

Music video cameos 
Tichichema  - Ammara Brown
Ngoro - Cynthia Mare
Watora Moyo - Shanky
Setter Pace - Cindy Munyavi
Firita - Baba Harare

Awards and accolades 
Zimbabwe Model Awards - Best Choreographer 2015 and 2016
Zimbabwe Hiphop Awards - Best Solo Dancer 2016
National Arts Merit Awards - Outstanding Dancer 2017 (nominee)
Events Industry Awards - Choreographer Of The Year 2018, Entertainer Of The Year 2018, Entertainer People's Choice 2018
Star FM Music Awards - Best House Song (Skoro skoro)2018 (nominee)
Zimbabwe Music Awards - Best Dance 2021 (nominee)
Changamire Awards - Best Dancer 2021 (nominee)

References

External links

 John Cole (official website)

Living people
1988 births
Zimbabwean dancers
Zimbabwean choreographers
People from Harare
Male dancers